Koonibba is a locality and an Aboriginal community in South Australia.

Koonibba may also refer to the following places and organisations in South Australia:

Koonibba Football Club
Koonibba Aboriginal School - refer List of Aboriginal schools in South Australia
Koonibba Railway Station - a stop on the Eyre Peninsula Railway
Koonibba Test Range, a rocket test range and space research site